JP Morgan American Investment Trust is a large British investment trust dedicated to investments in North America. Originally established in 1881, the company has been listed on the London Stock Exchange since 1955 and is a constituent of the FTSE 250 Index. The chairman is Dr Kevin Carter.

References

Financial services companies established in 1881
Investment trusts of the United Kingdom
JPMorgan Chase
Companies listed on the London Stock Exchange